{{multiple image
| align     = right
| direction = vertical
| image1    = Johann Nepomuk della Croce.jpg
| width1    = 250
| caption1  = Selfportrait from 1762
| image2    = Croce MozartFamilyPortrait.jpg
| width2    = 250
| caption2  = Wolfgang Amadeus Mozart with his sister Maria Anna and father Leopold, on the wall a portrait of his dead mother Anna Maria, c. 1780
}}

Johann Nepomuk della Croce (7 August 1736 – 4 March 1819) was an Austrian painter, known in Italy as Giovanni Nepomuceno della Croce. He was active in both Germany and Trentino in a late-Baroque style, depicting portraits and religious subjects.

Life and career
Johann Nepomuk della Croce was born at Pressano, in Tyrol, in 1736. He studied under Lorenzoni, an Italian artist and after travelling in Italy, Germany, Hungary, and France, he settled at Burghausen.

 estimated that della Croce painted 5000 portraits and 200 historical pictures. There are many altar-pieces painted by him in the churches of Bavaria. He painted a portrait of the Mozart family in Salzburg. He painted a canvas of the Battle of Lavis'' between the Austrian-Tyrolean troops and the French at the bridge of San Lazzaro on 5 September 1796. His son Clemente or Clemens della Croce (1783–1823) was also a painter.

He died in 1819.

References

Sources
 

1736 births
1819 deaths
18th-century Austrian painters
18th-century Austrian male artists
Austrian male painters
19th-century Austrian painters
19th-century Austrian male artists
People from Trentino